Kilema Kaskazini is a town and ward in the Moshi Rural district of the Kilimanjaro Region of Tanzania. Its population according to the 2012 census was 9,669.

References

Wards of Kilimanjaro Region